Zoner Albert "Zeke" Wissinger (October 30, 1902 – November 28, 1963) was an American football player from Johnstown, Pennsylvania, who played professionally during the early years of the National Football League (NFL). Wissinger attended and played football for the University of Pittsburgh. In 1925, he was elected to the College Football All-America Team. 

After college, Wissinger made his professional debut with the Pottsville Maroons. He played in only five NFL games, all with Pottsville. During the last game of the 1926 season, Wissinger and Mule Wilson, of the Buffalo Rangers, were both ejected from the game for fighting.

Wissinger later practice dentistry at the Highland Building in the East Liberty neighborhood of Pittsburgh. He died on November 28, 1963, at Shadyside Hospital in Pittsburgh.

References

External links
 
 

1902 births
1963 deaths
20th-century dentists
American dentists
American football tackles
Pittsburgh Panthers football players
Pottsville Maroons players
Sportspeople from Johnstown, Pennsylvania
Players of American football from Pennsylvania